= Krystyna Kuhn =

German writer

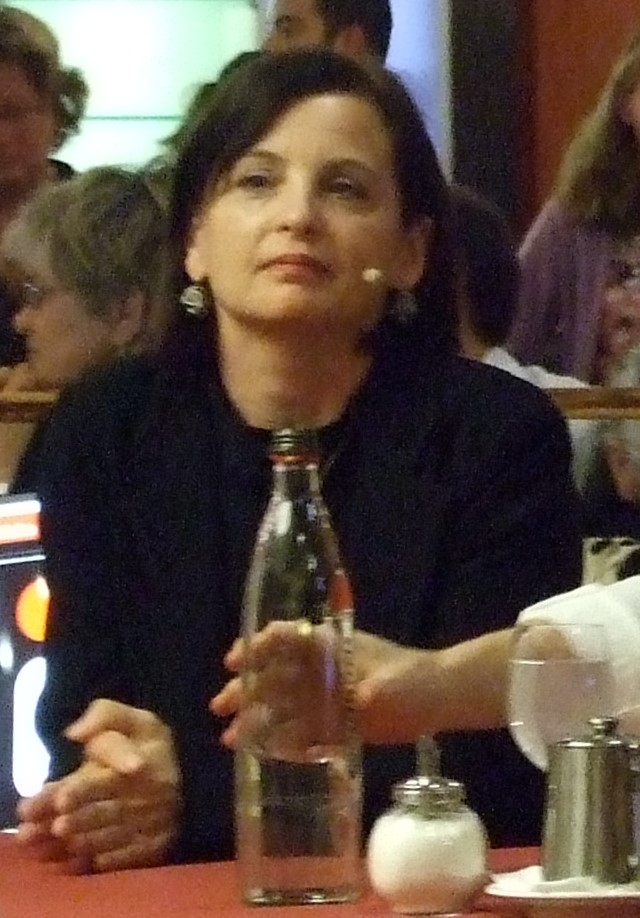
Krystyna Kuhn

Krystyna Kuhn (born 1960, in Würzburg) is a German writer, best known for her crime-thriller book series Das Tal Season (2010–2013) and Monday Club (2015–2016).
